The 2014–15 Nemzeti Bajnokság I/A was the 79th season of the Nemzeti Bajnokság I/A, the highest tier professional basketball league in Hungary.

Teams 

The following 10 clubs competed in the NB I/A during the 2015–16 season:

Personnel and kits

Regular season (Alapszakasz)

Results

Playoffs
Teams in bold won the playoff series. Numbers to the left of each team indicate the team's original playoff seeding. Numbers to the right indicate the score of each playoff game.

Finals
In the finals, teams play against each other which must win three games to win the title. Thus, if one team win three games before all five games have been played, the remaining games are omitted. The team that finished in the higher Regular season place will be played the first, the third and the fifth (if it is necessary) game of the series at home.

Game 1

Game 2

Game 3

UNIQA Sopron won the FINAL series 3–0.

Play-out
9th placed team hosted Games 1, plus Game 3 if necessary. 10th placed team hosted Game 2.

Hungarian clubs in European competitions

EuroLeague Women
UNIQA Sopron

EuroCup Women

Aluinvent DVTK

PEAC-Pécs

UNI GYŐR

PINKK-Pécsi 424

External links
 Hungarian Basketball Federaration 

Nemzeti Bajnokság I/A (women's basketball) seasons
Women
Hungarian